Orestrate, also known as estradiol 3-propionate 17β-(1-cyclohexenyl) ether, is an estrogen medication and estrogen ester which was never marketed. It is the C3 propionate ester and C17β-(1-cyclohexenyl) ether of estradiol.

See also
 List of estrogen esters § Esters of steroidal estrogens

References

Abandoned drugs
Cyclohexenes
Estradiol esters
Estranes
Estrogen ethers
Synthetic estrogens